Kelsch is a surname. Notable people with the surname include:

 Mose Kelsch (1897–1935), American football player
 RaeAnn Kelsch (1960–2018), American politician
 Walter Kelsch (born 1955), German football player